is a passenger railway station  located in Kita-ku Kobe, Hyōgo Prefecture, Japan. It is operated by the private transportation company, Kobe Electric Railway (Shintetsu).

Lines

Station layout
The station consists of one island platform, of which platform 2 is the primary platform and is used for bi-directional traffic. The platform is connected to the station building by a level crossing.

Platforms

Adjacent stations

History
On 18 December 1928, the station was opened with the opening of the Sanda Line.

Passenger statistics
In fiscal 2019, the station was used by an average of 2,780 passengers daily

Surrounding area
Arima Highway
Hyogo Prefectural Road No. 38 Miki Mita Line
Kobe Research Park Kanokodai

See also
List of railway stations in Japan

References

External links 

 Official home page 

Railway stations in Kobe
Railway stations in Japan opened in 1928